Westbury is a surname. Notable people with the surname include:

People
 Edgar T. Westbury (1896–1970), British model engineer
 Frank Atha Westbury (1838–1901), British author, popular in Australia and New Zealand
 Gerald Westbury (1927–2014), English surgeon who pioneered treatments for cancer
 Isabelle Westbury (born 1990), English cricketer
 John Westbury (died c. 1440/49), MP for Wiltshire in 1417 and 1419
 June Westbury (1921–2004), Canadian politician born in New Zealand
 Katherine Westbury (born 1993), Thai-New Zealand tennis player
 Marcus Westbury (born 1974), Australian festival director
 Marjorie Westbury (1905–1989), English actress and singer
 Paul Westbury, Chief Executive Officer of engineering company Buro Happold
 Peter Westbury (1938–2015), British racing driver
 Richard Bethell, 1st Baron Westbury (1800–1873), Lord Chancellor of Great Britain
 William de Westbury (died c. 1440), English judge, Justice of the King's Bench